Hurricane Florence attained Category 1 intensity on three separate occasions in mid-September 2000. The tenth tropical cyclone, sixth named storm, and third hurricane of the 2000 Atlantic hurricane season, Florence developed on September 10 from a cold front to the southwest of Bermuda. Initially a subtropical cyclone, it quickly organized, attaining hurricane status twice in a two-day period before weakening while remaining nearly stationary. Florence accelerated northeastward, reaching peak winds as a hurricane after passing near Bermuda. On September 17, the storm was absorbed by a larger extratropical cyclone. Hurricane Florence threatened Bermuda during its third time at hurricane intensity, bringing tropical storm force winds to the island but causing no reported damage. However, three deaths in North Carolina were blamed on rip currents triggered by the hurricane on September 12.

Meteorological history

During the first week of September, a cold front moved off the East Coast of the United States and stalled over the Atlantic Ocean. By September 8, a weak frontal wave began developing along the cold front. Late on September 9, convection increased over the broad low pressure area, and the overall system intensified beneath an upper-level low. Subsequently, the system abandoned its frontal features as its appearance became more circular. With persistent but limited convection near and to the west of the center, the National Hurricane Center (NHC) estimated the system developed into a subtropical depression late on September 10 about 375 mi (604 km) west-southwest of Bermuda; it was considered subtropical because the upper-circulation was believed to have been cold-core. Operationally, advisories on the system were not initiated until 21 hours later.

Subsequent to developing, deep convection began developing and increasing around the center. On September 11, an Advanced Microwave Sounding Unit temperature cross-section analysis indicated the system developed a warm thermal core; as a result, it was re-classified as Tropical Depression Ten. Convection continued increasing, and it intensified to tropical storm status by 1200 UTC. Operationally, it was considered a tropical depression, and significant strengthening was not expected. However, reports from Hurricane Hunters confirmed the presence of tropical storm force winds, and as a result the National Hurricane Center named the cyclone Florence. The storm continued quickly intensifying, and with the Hurricane Hunters reporting flight-level winds of over 85 mph (140 km/h), it was estimated Florence attained hurricane status late on September 11, or just six hours after the National Hurricane Center began issuing advisories on the storm. The strongest winds were confined to a very small area near the edge of the convection. Initially, the hurricane was tracking west-southwestward, steered by a mid-level ridge to its northwest.

On September 12, the entrainment of drier air weakened Florence to tropical storm status. At the same time, its motion became nearly stationary as a ridge to its southeast weakened steering currents. An eye developed in the center of the cyclone, and Florence again attained hurricane status late on September 12. Cooler water temperatures caused the hurricane to again weaken to tropical storm status on September 13. The next day, increased vertical wind shear accelerated the weakening, leaving its cloud pattern disorganized. An approaching short-wave trough turned Florence to the east-southeast and later to the east-northeast as its forward motion increased. Convection increased near the center as the overall structure improved. Based on reports from the Hurricane Hunters, Florence was upgraded to hurricane status on September 16 about 200 mi(320 km) southwest of Bermuda. Later that day, the hurricane passed about 75 mi (120 km) northwest of Bermuda, its closest approach. Late on September 16, Florence reached peak winds of 80 mph (130 km/h) as an eyewall became apparent. Cooler waters weakened the hurricane to tropical storm status by September 17 as its motion accelerated further due to the approaching trough. Later that day, Florence was absorbed by the extratropical storm associated with the trough about 80 mi (130 km) south of Cape Race on the island of Newfoundland.

Impact

Early in its duration, Hurricane Florence produced large swells that affected the East Coast of the United States. Rip currents caused three deaths due to drowning in North Carolina, all in the southern portion of the state. Seven other people needed rescue, and at least two beaches were closed. Florence contributed to a locally high number of rip current-related deaths in 2000; in response, the National Weather Service office in Wilmington implemented a new rip current warning system for the summer of 2001.

On September 14, the government of Bermuda issued a tropical storm watch for the island; it was upgraded to a tropical storm warning the next day and later to a hurricane warning. The island endured sustained winds of 41 mph (67 km/h), gusting to 58 mph (93 km/h). Rainfall at L.F. Wade International Airport accumulated 0.47 in (12 mm). Later, the remnants of Florence produced significant rainfall, peaking at 2.26 in (57.5 mm), along Newfoundland's Avalon Peninsula.

See also

Other tropical cyclones named Florence
List of North Carolina hurricanes (2000–present)
Timeline of the 2000 Atlantic hurricane season

References

External links

 Monthly Weather Review
 National Hurricane Center 2000 Atlantic hurricane season summary

Category 1 Atlantic hurricanes
2000 Atlantic hurricane season
Florence